The Yarlside Iron Mines tramway or Parkhouse Mineral Railway was built as a one-mile (1.6 km) long innovative railway from the Parkhouse Haematite Ore Mines to the Roose railway station on the Furness Railway, then in North Lancashire, now in Cumbria, England. Similar to a monorail, it had stabilising side rollers, invented and patented by John Barraclough Fell.

History

Yarlside Iron Mines tramway 
John Barraclough Fell designed and built in 1868 the original Yarlside Iron Mines tramway as a horse drawn monorail from an exchange siding at the Furness Railway to the Yarlside Iron Mines.

Parkhouse Tramway
Two years later, in 1870, John Barraclough Fell replaced it with another experimental narrow gauge railway line, dubbed the Parkhouse Tramway, named after the  Parkhouse Farm west of the mines. It was driven by a stationary engine and endless wire rope. It could transport up to 100,000 tons per year. The waggons were each loaded with one ton of iron ore, and small carriages with eight passengers were run with perfect steadiness and safety at a speed of 15 to 20 miles per hour.

The line became a standard gauge railway in 1873.

See also 
 Aldershot Narrow Gauge Suspension Railway
 Hathorn Davey

References

Further reading

Monorails in the United Kingdom
8 in gauge railways in England
Defunct monorails